Waukaringa is a locality in the Australian state of South Australia located about  north-east of the state capital of Adelaide and about  north of Yunta in the state's Far North region.

The name was first used for a town proclaimed on 1 November 1888 and which was formally declared to have ceased to exist on 8 July 1982.  Boundaries which include the former town were created for the locality on 29 May 1997 and which are completely surrounded by the locality of Melton Station.

The area was initially settled in 1873 with the discovery of gold. In 1890, Waukaringa was estimated to have had a population of 750. The former town of Waukaringa is now a ghost town after being abandoned in the 1950s. Ruins of only a few buildings remain, principally the former Waukaringa Hotel.

The main mines in the goldfield were Alma and Victoria, Alma Extended, West Waukaringa and Balaclava. A stone chimney from the Alma and Victoria mine is still visible. The Alma and Victoria Mine Site and Structures are listed on the South Australian Heritage Register.

The setting for The Silent Sea, written by Catherine Edith Macauley Martin under the pseudonym Mrs. Alick Macleod, was based on mining and life at Waukaringa. The book was partly written while Martin lived in the town.

Australian Rules footballer Harold Oliver was born in Waukaringa in 1891.

Waukaringa is located within the federal division of Grey, the state electoral district of Stuart and the Pastoral Unincorporated Area of South Australia.

References

Mining towns in South Australia
Ghost towns in South Australia
Far North (South Australia)
Places in the unincorporated areas of South Australia